Jacob Brett Farrell (born 19 November 2002) is an Australian professional footballer who plays as a left back for Central Coast Mariners.

Playing career

Club
Farrell signed a senior contract with Central Coast Mariners in November 2021, aged eighteen, after 6 years with the Central Coast Mariners Academy. He made his first-team debut for the Mariners in a win over Blacktown City in the 2021 FFA Cup on 13 November 2021.

He made his A-League Men debut on 21 November 2021 in an F3 Derby against Newcastle Jets and scored a header in a 2–1 win. Farrell went on to be a regular starter for the Mariners in their 2021–22 season.

International
Farrell was called up to the Australian under-23 side for the 2022 AFC U-23 Asian Cup in June 2022.

See also
List of Central Coast Mariners FC players

References

External links

2002 births
Living people
Australian soccer players
Association football defenders
Central Coast Mariners Academy players
Valentine Phoenix FC players
Central Coast Mariners FC players
National Premier Leagues players
A-League Men players